Flora is an unincorporated community in Natchitoches Parish, Louisiana, United States. It is located near the intersection of Louisiana highways 120 and 478, south of Natchitoches.

The community is part of the Natchitoches Micropolitan Statistical Area.

References 

Unincorporated communities in Natchitoches Parish, Louisiana
Unincorporated communities in Louisiana
Populated places in Ark-La-Tex